Eidsvoll is a railway station located at Eidsvoll in Akershus, Norway. The station is a terminal of the Trunk Line, the Gardermoen Line, and the Dovre Line. Though the Dovre Line and the Trunk Line/Gardermoen Line practically are the same continual railway, there is a naming change at the station, thus making it a terminus for all the three lines. The station serves the Oslo Commuter Rail to Kongsberg and regional trains to Lillehammer, Drammen and Skien. In the summer the paddle steamer Skibladner operates from the docks at the station.

History

The original station was amongst Norway's first railway and opened in 1854. When the new Gardermoen Line from Oslo via Oslo Airport, Gardermoen to Eidsvoll opened in 1998, a new station was built slightly northwards to allow it to serve both the Trunk Line and the Gardermoen Line.

References

Railway stations on the Trunk Line
Railway stations on the Gardermoen Line
Railway stations on the Dovre Line
Railway stations in Eidsvoll
Railway stations opened in 1854
1854 establishments in Norway